Shiadeh or Shia Deh or Sheyadeh may refer to:
 Shiadeh-e Bala
 Shiadeh Sadat Mahalleh